The Scout Association of Dominica, the national Scouting organization of Dominica, was founded in 1929, and became a member of the World Organization of the Scout Movement in 1990. The coeducational Scout Association of Dominica has 1,100 members as of 2004.

Scouting is active mainly in the villages of this Caribbean island. Dominica's programs closely follow that of the United Kingdom.

Dominica Scouts participate in many Caribbean camps, and hosted the 1994 Caribbean Jamboree.

See also
 The Girl Guides Association of Dominica

World Organization of the Scout Movement member organizations
Scouting and Guiding in Dominica
Youth organizations established in 1929